Claybank is a small hamlet in the  southern part of the Canadian province of Saskatchewan at the foot of the Dirt Hills. The community is named for the rich clay deposits found in the area. Claybank is best known for its National Historic Site of Canada, the Claybank Brick Plant, which closed in 1989 but remains one of the finest examples of 20th century industry. It is part of the RM of Elmsthorpe No. 100.

Demographics 

See also
List of communities in Saskatchewan

References

Designated places in Saskatchewan
Elmsthorpe No. 100, Saskatchewan
Organized hamlets in Saskatchewan
Division No. 2, Saskatchewan